The UK Rock & Metal Singles Chart is a record chart which ranks the best-selling rock and heavy metal songs in the United Kingdom. Compiled and published by the Official Charts Company, the data is based on each track's weekly physical sales, digital downloads and streams. In 2015, there were 17 singles that topped the 52 published charts. The first number-one single of the year was "Drown" by Bring Me the Horizon, the first single from the band's fifth studio album That's the Spirit, which spent the first week atop the chart.
The final number-one single of the year was the 2003 release "Christmas Time (Don't Let the Bells End)" by The Darkness, which reached number one for the week ending 17 December and remained there for the last three weeks of the year.

Chart history

See also
2015 in British music
List of UK Rock & Metal Albums Chart number ones of 2015

References

External links
Official UK Rock & Metal Singles Chart Top 40 at the Official Charts Company
The Official UK Top 40 Rock Singles at BBC Radio 1

2015 in British music
United Kingdom Rock and Metal Singles
2015